Chozen is an American adult animated sitcom, which aired from January 13, to March 31, 2014, on FX and which was created by Grant Dekernion. The show aired for one season.

Production
Chozen was announced as the first original series pick-up for FXX, FX's spin-off network that launched in 2013, but was later reassigned to FX where it aired after Archer on Monday nights.

The series was a collaboration between the producers of Eastbound & Down and the producers of Archer.

On May 14, 2014, Chozen was cancelled after one season.

Chozen was released on DVD on December 16, 2014 exclusively through Amazon as a "manufactured on demand" DVD-R set. The MOD double-disc set contains three previously unaired episodes.

Plot
Chozen is a gay white gangsta rapper on a quest to rebuild his career after being released from prison.

Characters

Main characters
 Phillip "Chozen" Cullens (voiced by Bobby Moynihan, singing voice provided by Grant DeKernion)A 28-year-old, white, gay rapper. Framed for crimes he did not commit, he survived a 10-year prison sentence. Upon his release, he sets out to reclaim what is his. His music and lyrics take aim at the stereotypes of machismo and misogyny that are synonymous with rap music. Adding to the challenge of an already lofty set of goals, Chozen is ten years behind in areas crucial to a successful music career, such as technology and pop-culture in general.
 Crisco (voiced by Hannibal Buress)A struggling rapper in his late twenties. Crisco previously worked entertaining children with positive rap lyrics. He is largely a gigolo, living rent-free as long as his girlfriend is sexually satisfied.
 Ricky (voiced by Michael Peña)A DJ and fellow rapper who works alongside Crisco performing at kids' birthday parties. His catchphrase is finishing his sentences with "...and shit". He still lives at home (although he claims he lives in a separate unit).
 Tracy Cullens (voiced by Kathryn Hahn)Chozen's college-aged sister. She had dreams of being an Olympic gymnast, now attends classes at Palm View University. She is the only character who calls her brother by his given name. Chozen moves in with her when he's released from prison. Tracy is disgusted and embarrassed by nearly everything her brother says and does, including making passes at male classmates, farting in public and masturbating while watching movies.
 Troy (voiced by Nick Swardson)A stereotypical gamer and nerd. Troy is a college student who gets picked on by other students. He wants to ask Tracy out but he can't summon the courage to do so and competes against Ricky for her attention. Crisco and Ricky offer to help him lose his virginity the same way Ricky did, with a legendary (now middle-aged) Hispanic prostitute.
 Hunter (voiced by Ike Barinholtz)An openly gay college student attending Palm View. He is Chozen's former lover. Hunter constantly pursues a real relationship while Chozen desires only sex, and avoids anything involving emotions and feelings. Hunter is gullible and naïve. He leaves Chozen in the episode "Boy's Night."
 Idris "Phantasm" Florentine (voiced by Method Man)The reigning top rapper of the hip-hop world. He is the target of Chozen's hostility. Phantasm was a former member of Chozen's crew until he got fed up with his clean image. He framed Chozen for his own illegal activities, sending Chozen to prison and sparking his own rise to the top.
 Jameson Z. "Jimmy" Cromwell (voiced by Danny McBride)A 39-year-old former roadie and pyrotechnics maker, now a member of Chozen's crew. A perverted, skinny metalhead. He has since embraced the digital realm and makes his own voyeurism videos for the Internet, such as cheerleader cleavage and panty shots and women's diving team accidents (which captures both the porn demographic and the fans of "epic fail" videos).

Other characters
 Jamal St. Clair (voiced by Gary Anthony Williams)A black, gay inmate with a violent streak. Chozen's first lover. He was arrested by authorities for helping run Napster though he claims he also set a man on fire. A brutally sadistic man, he attempted to remove Chozen from his crew which escalated to a fight. Jamal redeems himself and saves Chozen from violating parole by attacking the cops. He was shot and killed by the police when escaping arrest. The black officer whose nose he broke was the one who fired first.
 Brooklyn ChanThe Asian-American Sneakerhead who owns the store "Laced". Chan operates his business via his smartphone. He offered Chozen's crew a gig when he heard they ran with Phantasm. But Chozen and Jamal's fist fight resulted in his store being looted.

Episodes

Principal cast

Additional voices

International broadcast 
Chozen premiered in Australia on 5 January 2015 on The Comedy Channel.

References

External links
 

2010s American adult animated television series
2010s American LGBT-related comedy television series
2010s American sitcoms
2014 American television series debuts
2014 American television series endings
American adult animated comedy television series
American adult animated musical television series
American animated sitcoms
American flash adult animated television series
English-language television shows
FX Networks original programming
Hip hop television
Animated television series about bears
LGBT characters in animation
2010s American LGBT-related animated television series
Gay-related television shows
Television series by 20th Century Fox Television
Television series by Fox Television Animation